Tenuidactylus is a  genus of lizards in the family Gekkonidae (geckos). The genus contains eight species.

Species
Species in the genus Tenuidactylus are:
Tenuidactylus bogdanovi  
Tenuidactylus caspius 
Tenuidactylus dadunensis 
Tenuidactylus elongatus 
Tenuidactylus fedtschenkoi 
Tenuidactylus longipes  
Tenuidactylus turcmenicus 
Tenuidactylus voraginosus 

Nota bene: A binomial authority in parentheses indicates that the species was originally described in a genus other than Tenuidactylus.

References

External links
 

 
Lizard genera